Flaveria robusta is a rare Mexican plant species of Flaveria within the family Asteraceae. It has been found only in Colima and nearby western Michoacán in west-central Mexico.

Flaveria robusta is a shrub up to 170 cm (68 inches or 5 2/3 feet) tall. One plant can produce numerous small flower heads in loose, branching arrays. Each head contains about 7 disc flowers but no ray flowers.

References

External links
photo of herbarium specimen at Missouri Botanical Garden, collected in Colima in 1891

robusta
Endemic flora of Mexico
Flora of Colima
Flora of Michoacán
Plants described in 1895